Alpena High School may refer to:

In the United States 
 Alpena High School (Arkansas), Alpena, Arkansas
 Alpena High School (South Dakota), Alpena, South Dakota (closed)
 Alpena High School (Michigan), Alpena, Michigan